The Malpighian layer (stratum mucosum or stratum malpighii) of the epidermis, the outermost layer of the skin, is generally defined as both the stratum basale (basal layer) and the thicker stratum spinosum (spinous layer/prickle cell layer) immediately above it as a single unit, although it is occasionally defined as the stratum basale specifically, or the stratum spinosum specifically.

It is named after the Italian biologist and physician Marcello Malpighi.

Basal cell carcinoma originates from the basal layer of the stratum malpighii.

This layer is where almost all of the mitotic activity in the epidermis occurs. The activity of these cells is increased by IL-1 (interleukin-1) and epidermal growth factor. The activity is decreased by transforming growth factor beta.

See also 
 Epidermis

References 

Dermatologic terminology